The 2000–01 Southern Football League season was the 98th in the history of the league, an English football competition.

Margate won the Premier Division and earned promotion to the Football Conference. Clevedon Town, Dorchester Town, Fisher Athletic and Halesowen Town were relegated from the Premier Division, whilst Chelmsford City, Tiverton Town, Newport (Isle of Wight) and Hinckley United were promoted from the Eastern and Western Divisions, the former two as champions. Bromsgrove Rovers and Paget Rangers were relegated to the eighth level, whilst Baldock Town and Witney Town of the Eastern Division folded at the end of the season.

Premier Division
The Premier Division consisted of 22 clubs, including 17 clubs from the previous season and five new clubs:
Two clubs promoted from the Eastern Division:
Fisher Athletic
Folkestone Invicta

Two clubs promoted from the Western Division:
Moor Green
Stafford Rangers

Plus:
Welling United, relegated from the Football Conference

League table

Eastern Division
The Eastern Division consisted of 22 clubs, including 17 clubs from the previous season and five new clubs:
Two clubs relegated from the Premier Division:
Grantham Town
Rothwell Town

Plus:
Banbury United, promoted from the Hellenic League
Histon, promoted from the Eastern Counties League
Langney Sports, promoted from the Sussex County League

At the end of the season Langney Sports changed name to Eastbourne Borough.

League table

Western Division
The Western Division consisted of 22 clubs, including 18 clubs from the previous season and four new clubs:
Two clubs relegated from the Premier Division:
Atherstone United 
Gloucester City

Plus:
Mangotsfield United, promoted from the Western Football League
Rugby United, transferred from the Eastern Division

At the end of the season Blakenall merged with Bloxwich Town of the Midland Alliance to form Bloxwich United.

League table

See also
Southern Football League
2000–01 Isthmian League
2000–01 Northern Premier League

References

Southern Football League seasons
6